Year 1306 (MCCCVI) was a common year starting on Saturday (link will display the full calendar) of the Julian calendar.

Events 
 By place 

 England 
 February 10 – Robert the Bruce murders John Comyn III (the Red), Scottish nobleman and political rival, before the high altar of the Greyfriars Church at Dumfries. Bruce and Comyn meet to discuss their differences at the church (without their swords). An argument between the two ensues, and Bruce draws his dagger in anger and stabs Comyn. He flees the church, telling his followers outside what has occurred. Roger de Kirkpatrick, cousin of Bruce, goes back inside and finishes off the seriously wounded Comyn. In response, Bruce is excommunicated by Pope Clement V.Armstrong, Pete (2003. Osprey: Stirling Bridge & Falkirk 1297–98, p. 88. .
 March 25 – Robert the Bruce is crowned king of Scotland by Bishop William de Lamberton at Scone, near Perth. Despite lacking the traditional coronation stone, diadem and scepter, all of which have transferred to London. During the ceremony, the Scottish nobles of Atholl, Lennox, Mar and Menteith are present – while the 18-year-old Elizabeth de Burgh is crowned queen of Scots. The coronation takes place in defiance of the English claims of suzerainty after King Edward I (Longshanks) strips John de Baliol of his crown as King of Scots. 
 May – Edward I (Longshanks) appoints Aymer de Valance, lieutenant for Scotland. Valence makes his base at Perth – along with Henry Percy and Robert Clifford, to organize an army. Edward gives special orders ("Raise the Dragon") that no mercy is to be granted, and all Scots taken in arms are to be executed without trial. He sends his son, Edward of Caernarfon, with a royal retinue to the Scottish frontier to persecute these orders. 
 June 19 – Battle of Methven: Scottish forces (some 5,000 men) under Robert the Bruce are defeated by the English army at Methven. During the battle, the Scots are overwhelmed by a surprise attack on their camp. They are outnumbered, but Bruce manages to form a phalanx to break free. Finally, he is forced to retreat, leaving many of his followers dead or soon to be executed.
 July – Battle of Dalrigh: Robert the Bruce is defeated by rival Scottish forces (some 1,000 men) led by John of Argyll (the Lame), chieftain and uncle of John Comyn III (the Red), of the Clan MacDougall at Dalrigh (known as "King's Field"). During the battle, Bruce himself narrowly escapes capture and takes with the remnants refuge in the mountains of Atholl (Scottish Highlands).
 September – English forces under Edward of Caernarfon capture and sack Kildrummy Castle. Edward takes Elizabeth de Burgh, Christina Bruce and Mary Bruce (sisters of Robert the Bruce), and Princess Marjorie Bruce (daughter of Bruce) as prisoners. He executes Nigel de Brus (younger brother of Bruce) for high treason, who is later hanged, drawn and quartered at Berwick.
 Winter – Robert the Bruce retires to the Isle of Rathlin with a small group of followers, including Bruce's brothers Edward, Thomas and Alexander, as well James Douglas, Niall mac Cailein and Malcolm II. He is welcomed by the Irish Bissett family and stays at Rathlin Castle (or Bruce's Castle). Robert reorganizes his resources and musters troops for the campaign in Scotland.

 Europe 
 Spring – King Philip IV (the Fair) turns his attentions to Italian bankers and orders the Jews to be exiled in France. The Jewish quarter in Paris is cleared and goods are confiscated – to regain money spent on expanding the domains of Flanders and Gascony. Meanwhile, rumors of a secret initiation ceremony of the Knights Templar create distrust, and Philip – while being deeply in debt to the Order for loans from his war against England, uses this distrust for political and religious motivations against the Templars.
 May – Sultan Muhammad III sends a Moorish fleet to capture Ceuta and to dispossess the Azafid leaders to Granada. Nasrid forces land in Ksar es-Seghir, Larache, and Asilah, occupying these Atlantic ports. Meanwhile, Uthman ibn Abi al-Ula, prince and member of the Marinid Sultanate, leads a rebellion against Sultan Abu Yaqub Yusuf an-Nasr. He conquers a mountainous area in northern Morocco and allies himself with Granada.Joseph F. O'Callaghan (2011). The Gibraltar Crusade: Castile and the Battle for the Strait, p. 121. University of Pennsylvania Press. . 
 Summer – The Knights Hospitaller led by Grand Master Foulques de Villaret land with a force (some 600 men) on Rhodes, and conquer most of the island except for the city of Rhodes, which remains in Byzantine hands. Other knights supported by 50 men capture the citadel of Kos, but are evicted by Byzantine reinforcements. Later, the Hospitallers capture the (probably deserted) Feraklos Castle on September 20.
 September 29 – The Hatuna Games are played in Sweden. Duke's Eric Magnusson and Valdemar Magnusson, arrive at the estate of their brother, King Birger Magnusson, by Lake Malar. They are invited as guests at a feast, but during the night Birger and his wife, Martha of Denmark, are captured by the two brothers and are imprisoned in the dungeon at Nyköping Castle – while Eric and Valdemar jointly take over the Swedish throne.
 December 6 – The monetary policy of Philippe le Bel triggers a revolt in Paris. The provost's house is burned, and Philip IV (the Fair) has to flee to the fortress of the Temple.

 Asia 
 Mongol invasion of India: Mongol forces invade the Delhi Sultanate, Sultan Alauddin Khalji sends an army under Malik Kafur to deal with the invaders and defeats them at the banks of the Ravi River. The Delhi army kills and captures many Mongols in their pursuit. Alauddin orders the survivors to be trampled under the feet of elephants.Jackson, Peter (2003). The Delhi Sultanate: A Political and Military History, p. 230. .

 By topic 

 Economy 
 In London, a city ordinance decrees that heating with coal is forbidden when Parliament is in session (the ordinance is not particularly effective).

 Religion 
 Storkyrkan, the current cathedral of Stockholm, is consecrated by Birger Jarl (or Magnusson).

Births 
 August 8 – Rudolf II (the Blind), German nobleman and co-ruler (d. 1353)
 Ashikaga Tadayoshi, Japanese nobleman, samurai and general (d. 1352)
 Isabella of Brienne, Latin noblewoman (suo jure) and claimant (d. 1360)
 Sasaki Takauji, Japanese bureaucrat, warrior, poet and writer (d. 1373)

Deaths 
 February 10 – John Comyn III (the Red), Scottish nobleman (b. 1274)
 March – Araniko (or Anige), Nepalese court architect and painter (b. 1245)
 March 21 – Robert II, French nobleman (House of Burgundy) (b. 1248)
 May 5 – Constantine Palaiologos, Byzantine prince and general (b. 1261)
 August 4 – Wenceslaus III, king of Hungary, Croatia and Poland (b. 1289)
 September 12 – An Hyang, Korean scholar and philosopher (b. 1243)
 September 21 – Wonbi Hong, Korean noblewoman and royal consort
 September 22 – John of Paris, French scholar, theologian and writer
 November 7 – John of Strathbogie, Scottish nobleman and Justiciar
 December 6 – Roger Bigod, English nobleman, knight and Marshal
 December 12 – Conrad of Offida, Italian monk and preacher (b. 1241)
 December 25 – Jacopone da Todi, Italian monk and mystic (b. 1230)

References